The 1980 Nobel Prize in Literature was awarded the Polish-American poet and prose writer Czesław Miłosz (1911–2004) "who with uncompromising clear-sightedness voices man's exposed condition in a world of severe conflicts."

Laureate

Czeslaw Miłosz was primarily a poet. In 1934, he released his first poetry collection, Poemat o czasie zastygłym ("A Poem on Frozen Time"). His early works frequently have a sense of impending doom, but as time went on, he softened the worldly image he painted. His best-known work, the non-fiction Zniewolony umysł ("The Captive Mind", 1953), explores the effects of an oppressive system on four authors. Miłosz fought against being branded a political writer and maintained that his works addressed eternal questions like life and death, faith and doubt, and good and evil. His other celebrated poetry collections include Ocalenie ("Rescue", 1945), Traktat poetycki ("A Treatise on Poetry", 1957), Gdzie wschodzi słońce i kędy zapada ("Where the Sun Rises and Where it Sets", 1974).

References

External links
 1980 Press release nobelprize.org

1980